The 2020 Rally Japan (also known as the Rally Japan 2020) was a motor racing event for rally cars that was scheduled to be held over four days between 19 and 22 November 2020, but was cancelled due to the COVID-19 pandemic. It was set to mark the seventh running of Rally Japan and planned to be the final round of the 2020 World Rally Championship, World Rally Championship-2 and World Rally Championship-3. The 2020 event was scheduled to be based in Nagoya in Chūbu.

Sébastien Ogier and Julien Ingrassia were the defending rally winners. Citroën World Rally Team, the team they drove for in 2010, were the reigning manufacturers' winners, but would not defending their titles after parent company Citroën withdrew from the sport.

Background

Route

Itinerary
All dates and times are JST (UTC+9).

Preparation and cancellation

Rally Japan was scheduled to return to the calendar for the first time since , replacing Rally Australia as the final round of the championship. The rally was scheduled to move its headquarters from Hokkaidō to a new base in Nagoya and was to be run on tarmac rather than gravel. A candidate event had run in 2019. However, in response to the national COVID-19 pandemic, the Japanese government had increased the country's border restrictions, which led to the cancellation of the rally. The vacant spot left by the rally was taken by Belgium.

References

External links
   
 2020 Rally Japan at ewrc-results.com
 The official website of the World Rally Championship

2020 in Japanese motorsport
New Zealand
2020
Japan